Maurie Kilkeary was an Australian rugby league footballer who played one match as a winger for the Eastern Suburbs against Newtown in 1940.

References

Year of birth missing
Year of death missing
Australian rugby league players
Sydney Roosters players
Rugby league wingers